A tympanal organ (or tympanic organ) is a hearing organ in insects, consisting of a membrane (tympanum) stretched across a frame backed by an air sac and associated sensory neurons.  Sounds vibrate the membrane, and the vibrations are sensed by a chordotonal organ. Hymenoptera (bees, wasps, ants, etc.) do not have a tympanal organ, but they do have a Johnston's organ.

Tympanal organs occur in just about any part of the insect: the thorax, the base of the wing, the abdomen, the legs, etc., depending on the group of insects. The structures are thought to have evolved independently many times. As a result, their position and structures are often used to help determine the taxonomy of the species. For example, all members of the Geometridae share distinctive paired abdominal tympanal organs that open towards the front side of the first abdominal segment. Within the organ, particular structures vary in shape and are used to indicate shared ancestry of subfamilies. In other families of Lepidoptera having abdominal tympanal organs, the opening may be in a different orientation and the structures differ in shape.

Tympanal organs have evolved in Lepidoptera to allow them to detect the echolocation calls of predatory bats. The range of frequencies that the moth is most sensitive to is usually associated with the frequencies used in echolocation by the sympatric bat community. In the presence of predatory bats, it has been shown that the Lepidoptera species Mythimna unipuncta (true armyworm) stops mating behaviors, such as female calling and male wing flapping. As well, hearing is important for mating behaviors in this species because females increase their flapping frequency around males and males produce a trembling noise in response.

See also
 Tympanum (anatomy)

References

Insect anatomy
Sensory organs in animals